The 1992 United States presidential election in Georgia took place on November 3, 1992, and was part of the 1992 United States presidential election. Voters chose 13 representatives, or electors to the Electoral College, who voted for president and vice president.

Georgia was won by Governor Bill Clinton (D-AR). The presidential contest in the Peach State was the closest of any state that year with Clinton winning 43.47% to 42.88% over Incumbent President George H. W. Bush (R-TX) by a razor thin margin of 0.59%. This made it the first time that Georgia had voted Democratic since 1980, when it voted for Jimmy Carter, who was the former Governor. The state flipped back into the Republican column in 1996 and stayed there until 2020. From the mid-1960s into the 1990s, Georgia was a swing state in presidential elections, but also a state where Democrats generally dominated at the state and local level. Billionaire Businessman Ross Perot (I-TX) finished in third, with a significant 13.34% of the popular vote in the Peach state. This is the last time that Democrats would carry Pickens, Franklin, Lumpkin, Morgan, Lincoln, Brantley, Bacon, Worth, Bleckley, Monroe, Jeff Davis, Jones, Candler, Haralson, and Laurens counties. Ware County was tied, making this the last time it did not vote Republican, and the last time any county in the United States was tied between the Democratic and Republican parties.

Despite Clinton's victory in the Peach state, Republicans made significant gains during the coinciding congressional elections with former state Senator and Peace Corps Director Paul Coverdell's (R) victory over Incumbent U.S. Senator Wyche Fowler (D) in the Senate election runoff and gaining three of Georgia's U.S. House seats.

Georgia weighed in for this election as 5 points more Republican than the national average.

Results

Results by county

Notes

References

Georgia
1992
1992 Georgia (U.S. state) elections